Amin Zahir (born 17 September 1970) is a British fencer. He was educated at Highgate School. He competed in the team sabre event at the 1992 Summer Olympics. In 1993 and 1995, he won the sabre title at the British Fencing Championships.

References

1970 births
Living people
People educated at Highgate School
British male fencers
Olympic fencers of Great Britain
Fencers at the 1992 Summer Olympics
Sportspeople from Chelmsford